La vecindad is a Mexican telenovela produced by Televisa for Telesistema Mexicano in 1964.

Cast 
Julissa - Lupe 
Álvaro Zermeño - Juan Antonio 
Jacqueline Andere - Yolanda
Carmen Salinas - Cuca
Ofelia Guilmáin - Amalia 
Miguel Manzano - Manuel
Enrique Álvarez Félix - Jorge 
Emily Cranz - Elena
Rafael del Río - Gerardo 
Silvia Fournier - Cristina

References

External links 

Mexican telenovelas
1964 telenovelas
Televisa telenovelas
1964 Mexican television series debuts
1964 Mexican television series endings
Spanish-language telenovelas